I Am a Fugitive from a Georgia Chain Gang! (1932) is a book written by veteran Robert Elliott Burns and published by Grosset & Dunlap. 

The book recounts Burns' imprisonment on a chain gang in Georgia in the 1920s, his subsequent escape to New Jersey, and the furor that developed. The story was first published in January 1931, serialized  in True Detective Mysteries magazine.  Later that year, Burns's story was adapted as the motion picture I Am a Fugitive from a Chain Gang, starring Paul Muni. The book and movie were both credited with contributing to Governor Ellis Arnall's effort in 1943 to reform deplorable conditions on Georgia chain gangs. 

A sequel, Out of These Chains (1942), was written by Burns' brother, Vincent Godfrey Burns, an Episcopal priest.

The songwriter Jimmie Skinner, reading from his unfinished autobiography, recounts on Volume 6 of the compilation '"Doin' My Time" 1947-1963' that he wrote the country music classic "Doin' My Time" after reading the account of Robert Burns' imprisonment and escape in True Detective Mysteries magazine.

Bibliography
Robert Elliott Burns, I Am a Fugitive from a Georgia Chain Gang!, Vanguard Press, 1932; Gale Research, 1972; Beehive Press, 1994; University of Georgia Press, 1997,

References

Doin' My Time" 1947–1963, Volume 6, Bear Family Records, BCD 16613 FK, Germany, 2003

1932 non-fiction books
American memoirs
Memoirs adapted into films
Grosset & Dunlap books
Memoirs of imprisonment